Chaonia or Chaon (Greek Χαονία or Χάων) was the name of the northwestern part of Epirus, the homeland of the Epirote Greek tribe of the Chaonians. Its main town was called Phoenice. In Virgil's Aeneid, Chaon was the eponymous ancestor of the Chaonians.

Name
According to mythology, the eponymous ancestor of the Chaonians was Chaon. Etymologically, both the region of Χαονία 'Chaonia', and the name of its inhabitants Χάονες 'Chaones, Chaonians', derive from Χάων 'Chaon', which in turn derives from the Greek *χαϝ-ών 'place with abysses'; cf. Χάον ὄρος 'Chaon mountain' in Argolis, χάος 'chaos, space, abyss', χάσκω 'to yawn', χάσμα 'chasm, gorge'.

Geography
Strabo in his Geography, places Chaonia between the Ceraunian mountains in the north and the River Thyamis in the south.  The Roman historian, Appian, mentions Chaonia as the southern border in his description and geography of Illyria.

Important cities in Chaonia included Cestrine (modern Filiates), Chimaera (modern Himarë), Buthrotum, Phoenice, Cassiope (Modern Kassiopi) Panormos, Ilium (modern Despotiko) Onchesmus (modern Sarandë) and Antigonia.

Mythology
In Vigil's Aeneid, Aeneas visits Chaonia and meets Andromache and Helenus. He is told he must continue on to Italy, and instructed to meet the Sibyl concerning a more specific prophecy as to Aeneas's destiny.

See also
Thesprotians
Molossians

References

External links
Plutarch - Pyrrhus
Virgil - Aeneid